Virve is an Estonian and Finnish feminine given name and may refer to:

 (born 1930), Estonian textile artist
Virve Aruoja (1922–2013), Estonian television and film director and actress
Virve Eliste (1949–1949), youngest deportee during the Operation Priboi
Virve Holtsmeier (born 1944), archer
Virve Kiil (:et) (born 1973), Estonian glass artist
Virve Kiple (born 1927), Estonian ballerina and actress
Virve Koppel (1931–2016), Estonian television and film director
Virve Köster (born 1928; better known as Kihnu Virve), Estonian folk singer from Kihnu island
Virve Laev (born c. 1940), Estonian film editor
 (born 1946), Estonian poet and playwright
Virve Reid (born 1956), Canadian adult model
Virve Rosti (born 1958; better known as Vicky Rosti), Finnish singer
Virve Sarapik (born 1961), Estonian art scientist and semiotician (:et)

Surname
Tõnu Virve (1946–2019), Estonian theatre and film designer and artist, producer and director

See also
Virve (disambiguation)

Estonian feminine given names
Finnish feminine given names